This is an incomplete list of Statutory Instruments of the United Kingdom in 1970.

 The Building (Fifth Amendment) Regulations 1970 S.I. 1970/109
 Extradition (Genocide) Order 1970 S.I. 1970/147
 Fugitive Offenders (Genocide) Order 1970 S.I. 1970/148
 Merchant Shipping (Certificates of Competency as A.B.) Regulations 1970 S.I. 1970/294
 Abrasive Wheels Regulations 1970 S.I. 1970/535
 Diplomatic Privileges (Cititzens of the United Kingdom and Colonies) (Amendment) Order 1970 S.I. 1970/635
 Superannuation (Judicial Offices) Rules 1970 S.I. 1970/1021
 The Building (Sixth Amendment) Regulations 1970 S.I. 1971/1335
 Anchors and Chain Cables Rules 1970 S.I. 1970/1453
 Foreign Marriage Order 1970 S.I. 1970/1539
 The Parliamentary Constituencies (Scotland) Order 1970 S.I. 1970/1680
 Secretary of State for the Environment Order 1970 S.I. 1970/1681
 Weights and Measures (Local Standards: Limits of Error) Regulations 1970 S.I. 1970/1710
 Working Standards and Testing Equipment Testing and Adjustment) Regulations 1970 S.I. 1970/1714
 Children and Young Persons Act 1969 (Transitional Modifications of Part I) Order 1970 S.I. 1970/1882
 Eurocontrol (Immunities and Privileges) Order 1970 S.I. 1970/1940
 Legal Aid in Criminal Proceedings (General) (Amendment) Regulations 1970 S.I. 1970/1980
 UK Statutory Instrument 1970 No. 94

External links
Legislation.gov.uk delivered by the UK National Archive
UK SI's on legislation.gov.uk
UK Draft SI's on legislation.gov.uk

See also
List of Statutory Instruments of the United Kingdom

Lists of Statutory Instruments of the United Kingdom
Statutory Instruments